Abraham Vosloo (born 21 October 1966) is a South African educator and politician from the Northern Cape serving as the Member of the Executive Council (MEC) for Finance, Economic Development and Tourism since June 2020. He has been a Member of the Northern Cape Provincial Legislature since May 2019. He was the MEC for Roads and Public Works from May 2019 until June 2020. Vosloo was previously the Executive Mayor of the ZF Mgcawu District Municipality. He is a member of the African National Congress (ANC).

Early life and education
Vosloo was born on 21 October 1966 in Askham, Cape Province. He completed his secondary education at Carlton Van Heerden High School in Upington in 1985. Vosloo went on to achieve a teacher's diploma and a high diploma from the Perseverance School in Kimberley.

Career
Vosloo worked as a teacher at JJ Adams Primary School in his home town from 1990 to 1991. He was then employed at the Rosendal Primary School in Upington from 1992 until his appointment as a shop steward at SADTU. He was appointed the director of corporate services at the //Khara Hais Local Municipality in 2005; he held the post until 2012. In 2012, Vosloo was selected as municipal manager of the Kai ǃGarib Local Municipality. From 2013 to 2014, he served as the chair of the African National Congress in the ZF Mgcawu region. Vosloo was elected speaker of the district municipality in 2014. The next year, he was elected mayor of the municipality.

Provincial government
After the 2019 general election held on 8 May, he was nominated to the Northern Cape Provincial Legislature. He was sworn in as a member on 22 May 2019. On 29 May 2019, Vosloo was appointed Member of the Executive Council (MEC) for Roads and Public Works, succeeding Mxolisa Sokatsha. On 26 June 2020, Vosloo was moved to the Finance, Economic Development and Tourism portfolio of the Executive Council. He succeeded Maruping Lekwene, while Fufe Makatong succeeded him as Public Works MEC.

In October 2020, Vosloo stated that the agricultural sector in the Northern Cape had lost almost 10,000 jobs. He also stated that this could be due to seasonal factors and the COVID-19 lockdown restrictions.

Personal life 
In December 2020, Vosloo was hospitalised with COVID-19. He soon recovered in early-January 2021. His wife, Maria Minneth Vosloo, died due to complications from the virus on 23 January 2021.

References

External links
Abraham Vosloo – People's Assembly
Mr Abraham Vosloo – Northern Cape Provincial Legislature (NCPL)

Living people
People from the Northern Cape
Members of the Northern Cape Provincial Legislature
African National Congress politicians
1966 births
20th-century South African politicians
21st-century South African politicians